Martin Andrew Massengale (born October 25, 1933) is an American academic. He was the president of the University of Nebraska System from 1989 to 1994. Massengale is an alumnus of the University of Wisconsin and Western Kentucky University.

References

Living people
1933 births
Presidents of the University of Nebraska System
University of Wisconsin–Madison alumni
Western Kentucky University alumni

http://agronomy.unl.edu/massengale